Ignaz Brüll (7 November 184617 September 1907) was a Moravian-born pianist and composer who lived and worked in Vienna.

His operatic compositions included Das goldene Kreuz (The Golden Cross), which became a repertory work for several decades after its first production in 1875, but eventually fell into neglect after being banned by the Nazis because of Brüll's Jewish origins. He also wrote a small corpus of finely crafted works for the concert hall and recitals.  Brüll's compositional style was lively but unabashedly conservative, in the vein of Mendelssohn and Schumann.

Brüll was also highly regarded as a sensitive concert pianist. Johannes Brahms regularly wanted Brüll to be his partner in private performances of four-hand piano duet arrangements of his latest works. Indeed, Brüll was a prominent member of Brahms's circle of musical and literary friends, many of whom he and his wife frequently entertained.

In recent years, Brüll's concert music has been revived on CD, and well-received recordings are available of his piano concertos, among other non-vocal works.

In 1872 he was appointed professor at the Horak Institute in Vienna.

Biography

Early years
Brüll was born in Prostějov (Proßnitz) in Moravia, the eldest son of Katharina Schreiber and Siegmund Brüll. His parents were prosperous Jewish merchants and keen social musicians; his mother played piano and his father (who was closely related to the Talmudic scholar Nehemiah Brüll) sang baritone. In 1848 the family relocated their business to Vienna, where Brüll lived and worked for the rest of his life.

Brüll started learning piano from his mother around the age of eight and he quickly showed talent. Despite being the heir to the family business, his promise at the keyboard encouraged his parents to provide him with a serious musical training. By the age of ten, he was taking piano lessons from Julius Epstein, a professor at the Vienna Conservatory and friend of Brahms. A year later, in 1857, he began studying composition with Johann Rufinatscha; instrument instruction followed with Felix Otto Dessoff.

In 1860, while aged fourteen, Brüll started writing his Piano Concerto No. 1, which received its first public performance the following year in Vienna with Epstein as soloist. Further encouragement to pursue a musical career came with endorsement from the distinguished pianist-composer Anton Rubinstein.

Success and Das goldene Kreuz
Brüll scored another success with his Serenade No. 1 for Orchestra, which was premiered in Stuttgart in 1864. By now, Brüll was 18 years old and had just finished composing his first opera score, Die Bettler von Samarkand (The Beggars of Samarkand). Unfortunately, plans for a production at the Court Theatre in Stuttgart in 1866 failed to materialize, and the work was apparently never played.

By contrast, Brüll's second opera, Das goldene Kreuz (The Golden Cross), was by far his most successful: it held a place in the repertory for several decades and brought its composer into the public eye almost overnight. At its premiere in Berlin in December 1875, Brüll was personally complimented by the emperor, Wilhelm I. The opera, with a libretto by Salomon Hermann Mosenthal based on a story by Mélesville, involves an emotional drama of mistaken identities during the Napoleonic wars.

In parallel, Brüll had also been pursuing a career as a concert pianist, playing as a popular soloist and recitalist throughout the German speaking countries. The London premiere of Das goldene Kreuz, in an 1878 production by the Carl Rosa Opera Company, coincided with the first of two extensive concert tours of England, during which he was able to play his Piano Concerto No. 2 (another youthful work, written in 1868) and arrange performances of some of his other pieces. Brüll also toured with George Henschel.

The Brahms circle and later years

In 1882, Brüll married Marie Schosberg, a banker's daughter who became a popular hostess to Viennese musical and artistic society. Brüll now shifted his attention towards composition, reduced the number of concert engagements, and permanently gave up touring. He also found himself playing host to Johannes Brahms's circle of friends, including the powerful music critic Eduard Hanslick, the musically minded eminent surgeon Theodor Billroth, and composers such as Carl Goldmark, Robert Fuchs, and even Gustav Mahler. When Brahms wanted to audition his latest orchestral compositions, as was his habit, to a select group of connoisseurs in four-handed versions for two pianos, Brüll regularly played alongside the senior composer. From 1890, Brüll's new holiday home (the Berghof) in Unterach am Attersee also became a social venue.

Unlike Brahms, Brüll was a man of the theatre, and he went on to compose at least seven more operas, which however did not approach the same level of popular success as Das goldene Kreuz. His final opera, the two-act comedy Der Hussar, was well received when it was staged in Vienna in 1898.

Brüll was an honorary British consul at Budapest and was appointed an Honorary Companion of the Order of St Michael and St George in the 1902 Coronation Honours list on 26 June 1902.

Music

Brüll's other operas include: Der Landfriede (Vienna, 1877), Bianca (Dresden, 1879), Königin Mariette (Munich, 1883), Das Steinerne Herz (Prague, 1888), Gringoire (one act, Munich, 1892), and Schach dem König (Munich, 1893). For the ballet, he wrote the orchestral dance-suite Ein Märchen aus der Champagne (1896).

Orchestral concert works by Brüll include the Im Walde and Macbeth overtures, a symphony and three serenades, a violin concerto, and the two piano concertos, as well as three other piano concertante pieces. His chamber and instrumental music includes a suite and three sonatas for piano and violin, a trio, a cello sonata, a sonata for two pianos and various other piano pieces. He also wrote songs and part-songs.

Recordings
While a selection of Brüll's concert and recital works is now available on CD, the vocal output has been largely passed by: the few known commercial recordings, by Brüll's Moravian compatriot Leo Slezak and by Emanuel List among others, remain confined to vinyl. The second piano concerto was set down twice on elusive LPs, and in 1999, Hyperion Records released a well-received recording of the two piano concertos and a Konzertstück played by Martin Roscoe with the BBC Scottish Symphony Orchestra under Martyn Brabbins. Brüll's piano sonata has been recorded by Alexandra Oehler for CPO along with some other shorter keyboard pieces.

For the centenary of Brüll's death in 2007, the Cameo Classics record label and the Brüll Rediscovery Project began a recording programme intended to make Brüll's orchestral works known to a wider audience. His Symphony op. 31 and the Serenade No. 1, op. 29 were recorded by the Belarusian State Symphony Orchestra under Marius Stravinsky. Janet Olney recorded a selection of solo piano works by Brüll (CC9030CD). His Piano Sonata No. 3 was recorded in 2010 by Valentina Seferinova, as was his Serenade No. 2, op. 36 for Orchestra (CC9031CD). In 2011 the Musical Director of the Malta Philharmonic Orchestra, Michael Laus, corrected and completed the score of Brüll's Violin Concerto and recorded the complete work with Ilya Hoffman as soloist (due to multiple errors and gaps in both the score and Brüll's original manuscript, only the slow movement had been previously released). The Macbeth overture was also recorded. All the Cameo Classics recording sessions were filmed, and a documentary on the music of Brüll and his fellow German Jewish Romantic era composers is reported to be in preparation.

Notes and references
Notes

References

Further reading

External links 
 
 
 Concert Pianist Valentina Seferinova

1846 births
1907 deaths
19th-century classical composers
19th-century classical pianists
19th-century Czech male musicians
20th-century classical composers
20th-century classical pianists
20th-century Czech male musicians
Austrian classical pianists
Austrian Jews
Austrian male classical composers
Austrian music educators
Austrian opera composers
Austrian Romantic composers
Czech classical pianists
Czech Jews
Czech male classical composers
Czech music educators
Czech opera composers
Czech Romantic composers
Honorary Companions of the Order of St Michael and St George
Jewish classical composers
Male classical pianists
Male opera composers
People from Prostějov
People from the Margraviate of Moravia
Piano pedagogues